The Universal Mortar UB M52 is a 120 mm (4.75 inch) mortar that was developed by Military Technical Institute, in former Yugoslavia. It is long-range heavy mortar developed from the soviet M1938 mortar but with integral wheels carriage.

Design overview
First development versions prior UB M52 are known under designation BB-3, brdski bacač 3. The Universal Mortar UB M52 is developed from 1948 to 1951 and fires fin-stabilized ammunition from a smoothbore barrel. It is first mortar with capabilities to fire with wheels mounted. It has hydraulic muzzle attached to barrel to reduce pressure. M52 because of its weight require trucks or other vehicle to move them to battlefield, but compared to field artillery it is lighter. It can be deployed on battlefield in less than a minute.

Variants
M52 has 4 variants:
basic variant M52
improved variant M52A1 - reduced weight with some smaller parts, used rubber instead of skin for parts, new hydraulic fluid. 
improved variant M52A2 - has one cylinder less with improved muzzle
improved variant M52A3 - new hydraulic fluid with included fluid level indicator

Deployment
Universal Mortar UB M52 was in service with the Yugoslav People's Army since 1952. After dissolution of Yugoslavia it is passed on successor states. It is exported to numerous countries and produced in few thousand pieces.

The M52 was transported with horses, TAM-4500, Pinzgauer 710M and many or other vehicles capable to attach trailer.

Specifications

The M52 is capable of firing the following munitions:

High explosive shells 
 HE mortar shell M62P8
 HE mortar shell Mk12P1
 HE mortar shell Mk12P1-L
Illumination shells 
Illumination mortar shell M87P1
Illumination mortar shell M01
Smoke shells 
Smoke mortar shell M64P2
Smoke mortar shell M64P3
Smoke mortar shell Mk12
Smoke mortar shell M89
Practice shells
Practice mortar shell M63P2
and other shells in 120mm in accordance with barrel pressure.

Operators

: 95 as of 2020.
: In reserve.

: 25 UBM-52 in service. Received from Yugoslavia in 1971.
: In reserve, some in museum.
: In reserve.

Former operators

: Sold or in museums.
: Indonesian Marine Corps
: Offered for sale.

See also 

 M1938 mortar
 Soltam M-65

References

Military Technical Institute Belgrade
Mortars of Yugoslavia
120mm mortars
Military equipment introduced in the 1950s